Fede Finn and Funny Boyz (or in Danish language Fede Finn og Funny Boyz) is a Danish country music-inspired pop band and dansband signed to Beach Record label. The band was founded by Lennart Johannesen and has been active in dance halls and night venues for four decades and has had a number of cult songs made famous by the band as well as covers of well known country and non-country hits. The band has taken part in a number of festivals. It has also released a number of charting albums.

Maud Kofod has joined the band as a lead singer.

The band was featured in the thriller film Fri os fra det onde directed by Ole Bornedal.

Discography

References

External links
Official website

Danish musical groups
Dansbands